The 'Burbs is a 1989 American black comedy film directed by Joe Dante, and starring Tom Hanks, Bruce Dern, Carrie Fisher, Rick Ducommun, Corey Feldman, Wendy Schaal, Henry Gibson, and Gale Gordon. The film was written by Dana Olsen, who made a cameo appearance in the film. It pokes fun at suburban environments and their sometimes eccentric dwellers.

Plot
Suburban homeowner Ray Peterson is home on a week-long vacation. Late one night, he hears strange noises coming from the basement of his new and reclusive neighbors, the Klopeks. Ray and his other neighbors—Art Weingartner and Vietnam War veteran Mark Rumsfield—gradually suspect the Klopeks may be ritualistic murderers. On another night, they observe the youngest Klopek cart an oversized garbage bag to their curbside garbage can and aggressively mash it down. Later that night, during a rainstorm, Ray sees the Klopeks digging in their backyard. In the morning, Ray, Mark, and Art search the garbage truck for human remains after the Klopeks' trash is collected, but find nothing.

Mark's wife Bonnie finds their neighbor Walter's dog running loose. Worried about the elderly man, Ray, Art, the Rumsfields, and teenage neighbor Ricky Butler enter Walter's house and find overturned chairs and Walter's toupée, but no Walter. Ray collects the dog, leaves a note for Walter, slips the toupée back in through the mail slot, and sees one of the Klopeks watching him from their house. Ray and Art theorize that the Klopeks may have used Walter as a human sacrifice, becoming further convinced when Ray's dog digs up a human femur from along the Klopeks' fence line. Ray's wife Carol, tired of the men's behavior, organizes a welcome visit to the Klopeks. While the Petersons and Rumsfields meet Hans, Reuben, and Dr. Werner Klopek, Art snoops around the Klopeks' backyard and is chased out by a large dog. Afterward, Ray reveals to Art and Mark that he found Walter's mail and toupée at the Klopeks', proving they had been in Walter's house.

The next day, Ray sends Carol and their son Dave to visit Carol's sister. When the Klopeks leave, Art and Ray enter their backyard to search for Walter's corpse while Mark acts as lookout. Finding nothing in the yard, Art and Ray break into the Klopeks' basement, discover what appears to be a crematorium, and dig deep into the floor in search of human remains. The Klopeks return, accompanied by the police after having seen their basement lights on. Ray strikes a gas line with his pickaxe; Art escapes before the house explodes, and Ray emerges from the flames scorched and disheveled just as Carol returns home.

Walter arrives home during the commotion, having spent a few days in the hospital due to palpitations. He had asked the Klopeks to collect his mail for him, and they had mistakenly gathered up his toupée as well. Ray declares that he and the others were wrong about the Klopeks, and climbs into an ambulance. Werner enters and accuses Ray of having seen a human skull in the basement furnace, revealing that the Klopeks murdered the previous homeowners so they could live in their house. Werner attempts to lethally inject Ray as Hans drives the ambulance away. Their struggle causes the ambulance to crash into the Weingartners' house, ejecting Werner and Ray, who then makes a citizen's arrest. Ricky uncovers human skeletal remains in the Klopeks' car trunk. The Klopeks are arrested, and charges against Ray are dropped. Ray states that he and his family are going away for awhile, and asks Ricky to watch over the neighborhood.

Cast

Additional minor roles were played by Dick Miller and Robert Picardo as garbagemen Vic and Joe; Franklyn Ajaye and Rance Howard as detectives; Bill Stevenson, Gary Hays, and Carey Scott as Ricky's friends; and Kevin Gage and Dana Olsen as policemen.

Production

Writing
Screenwriter Dana Olsen based the script on experiences from his own childhood: "I had an ultranormal middle-class upbringing, but our town had its share of psychos. There was a legendary hatchet murder in the thirties, and every once in a while, you'd pick up the local paper and read something like 'LIBRARIAN KILLS FAMILY, SELF'. As a kid, it was fascinating to think that Mr. Flanagan down the street could turn out to be Jack the Ripper. And where there's fear, there's comedy. So I approached The 'Burbs as Ozzie and Harriet meet Charles Manson." Olsen's script attracted producer Larry Brezner, who brought it to Imagine Films. It was greeted with a warm reception from Imagine co-founder Brian Grazer: "I liked the concept of a regular guy taking a vacation in his own neighborhood, plus it was funny and well written. It suddenly dawned on me that Joe Dante would be fantastic [as a director] because it's a mixture of comedy, horror, and reality."

Dante, who had directed Gremlins and Innerspace, and his partner, Michael Finnell, were immediately impressed by the concept of the movie. Dante, who specialized in offbeat subject matter, was intrigued by the blending of real-life situations with elements of the supernatural: "When I tell people about the story, a remarkable number say, 'On my grandmother's block, there were people like that. They never mowed their lawn, and they never came out, and they let their mail stack up, and nobody knew who they were.' And I must confess that in my own neighborhood there's a house like that, falling to wrack and ruin. I think this is perhaps a more common event than most people are aware of."

Casting
Dante, Brezner, and Finnell agreed that Tom Hanks would be the most suitable actor to portray the married Ray Peterson, a conservative man who tries to introduce excitement into his life by investigating the activities of his strange neighbors. Dante referred to Hanks as "the reigning everyman, a guy that everybody can identify with", comparing him to James Stewart. Brezner echoed this sentiment, saying "Hanks is an actor capable of acting funny rather than funny acting. He also has no problem with transition from comedy to Pathos, as he showed in Nothing in Common, and he's now proving himself as one of the country's most versatile actors."

Hanks accepted the role of Ray with enthusiasm, later saying "What's so bizarrely interesting about this black psychocomedy is that the stuff that goes on in real life in a regular neighborhood will make your hair stand up on the back of your neck." He was also intrigued by his character's distinctive personality traits: "Sometimes there's more of an opportunity to create than others. Here's a guy with a great life – a nice house, a wife, a beautiful tree, a nice neighborhood – and he's happy. Next day, he hates it all. I thought something must've happened to him offstage. And that's the challenge for me of the part: to communicate Ray's offscreen dilemma. One of the reasons Ray doesn't go away on vacation is because it's another extension of the normalcy he's fallen into. So he thinks he'll try a more Bohemian thing, which is to just hang around the house. With a week's worth of free time on his hands, Ray is drawn into the pre-occupations of his neighbors, who always seem to be at home. But what I did is just back-story embellishment that any actor will do. Perhaps from my repertory experience. I don't ask a director for motivation. If he says, 'Go over to the window', I find the reason myself."

Hanks found admiration for Dante's directorial style, saying "Joe has a stylized, visionary way of looking at the entire movie. It's pure film-making – the story is told from the camera's point of view, and that's a type of movie I haven't made." Dante, in turn, praised his star. "The most impressive thing about Tom Hanks as a comic actor is how effortless he makes it seem. He actually is very diligent about his acting, but his comic sense of what is going to work – and what isn't – is really unparalleled." Dante's laid-back, casual style encouraged improvisation among the actors. He noted, "Tom doesn't like to do scenes the way they're always done. He goes out of his way to put a different spin on everything and his being good as he is and as open as he is encouraged the other actors to do the same. It set a tone for the movie that made it a lot of fun to make."

Filming
The 'Burbs was filmed entirely at Universal Studios over ten weeks in the summer of 1988, mainly on the Colonial Street set on the back lot, which served as the Mayfield Place cul-de-sac. "I can't think of many pictures since Lifeboat that all take place in the same area," Dante said as production got under way. "There was a lot of temptation to broaden it and go outside the neighborhood, but it seemed to violate the spirit of the piece. It's almost the kind of thing that could be a stage play except that you could never do on-stage what we've done in this movie." The Colonial Street set had been used in 1987's Dragnet, also starring Hanks. At the time The 'Burbs began production, it was being used as the location for The New Leave It to Beaver television series, so the entire area "reeked" of normalcy. Dante said, "I asked [production designer] James Spencer, a veteran of Poltergeist and Gremlins if he thought he could turn that street into the neighborhood we needed in that period of time." Spencer rose to the challenge, and within a few days they began work on sketching out the proposed designs for the sets. Spencer observed, "We had to be on the spot. Due to the lack of time, it would have been ludicrous to do our drawing elsewhere."

Release

Box office
The film opened at number 1 with $11,101,197 in its opening weekend (February 17–20, 1989). Overall, in the US, the film made $36,601,993 and $49,101,993 worldwide.

Critical reaction
Vincent Canby of The New York Times gave The 'Burbs a negative review, calling it "as empty as something can be without creating a vacuum".
Roger Ebert of the Chicago Sun-Times gave it two out of four stars, writing "The 'Burbs tries to position itself somewhere between Beetlejuice and The Twilight Zone, but it lacks the dementia of the first and the wicked intelligence of the second and turns instead into a long shaggy dog story." On review aggregator Rotten Tomatoes, the film has an approval rating of 53% based on 38 reviews, with an average rating of 5.98/10. The site's critical consensus reads, "The 'Burbs has an engaging premise, likable cast, and Joe Dante at the helm – so the mixed-up genre exercise they produce can't help but feel like a disappointment." On Metacritic, the film has a weighted average score of 45 out of 100, based on 20 critics, indicating "mixed or average reviews". Audiences polled by CinemaScore gave the film an average grade of "C" on an A+ to F scale.

Home media
Arrow Video released The 'Burbs on Blu-ray in 2014 in the UK with a new 2K scan of the inter-positive. The edition included a commentary by screenwriter Dana Olsen, a newly commissioned feature-length documentary titled There Goes the Neighborhood: The Making of The Burbs. In the United States, the film was first given a Blu-ray release in 2016 by Universal Studios. However, this release was criticized for poor quality and being a bare bones release. In 2018, Shout! Factory re-released the film on Blu-ray with the transfer and majority of the special features from the 2014 Arrow release from the UK.

Music
The orchestral soundtrack for the film was composed by Jerry Goldsmith.

Soundtrack releases

1992 soundtrack album on Varèse Sarabande
 "Main Title" – 2:23
 "Welcome to Mayfield Place" – 2:20
 "New Neighbors" – 2:06
 "Klopek House" – 2:02
 "Storytelling" – 3:20
 "Neighborhood Watch" – 2:01
 "A Nightmare in the 'Burbs" – 2:30
 "Brownies?" – 0:47
 "The Assault" – 2:36
 "Ray Peterson, Neighbor from Hell" – 1:43
 "Runaway Ambulance" – 2:24
 "Vacation's End" – 2:12
 "End Titles" – 4:10
Total duration: 30:34

2007 deluxe edition on Varèse Sarabande
 "Night Work" (Main Title) – 2:38
 "The Window / Home Delivery" – 2:22
 "The Raven" – 0:51
 "Nocturnal Feeders" – 0:27
 "Good Neighbors" – 2:06
 "Let's Go" – 2:04
 "Bad Karma" – 0:38
 "The Sentinel" – 3:22
 "My Neighborhood" – 2:04
 "The Garage" – 4:24
 "Spare Key" – 1:19
 "The Note" – 1:00
 "Devil Worship" – 1:12
 "The Dream" – 2:34
 "The Note #2" – 1:28
 "This is Walter" – 2:00
 "Snooping Around" – 0:50
 "I'm O.K." – 1:02
 "Ask Him" – 1:24
 "What's in the Cellar?" – 1:00
 "The Wig" – 2:23
 "Hot Wires" – 2:39
 "Red Rover, Red Rover" – 1:11
 "No Beer" – 3:07
 "Home Furnace" – 1:44
 "No Lights" – 0:48
 "Walter's Home" – 1:58
 "Something is Moving" – 1:46
 "There's a Body" – 1:04
 "My Skull / The Gurney" – 2:24
 "The Trunk" – 1:41
 "Pack Your Bags" – 2:15
 "Square One" (End Credits) – 4:14

Score album
 "Main Titles"
 "The House"
 "Welcome to Mayfield Place"
 "Shooting Crows"
 "Dave's Story"
 "New Neighbors"
 "Klopek House"
 "Bad Karma"
 "Storytelling"
 "Neighborhood Watch"
 "Garbage Disposal"
 "Little Dog Lost"
 "A Klopek Watching"
 "A Hell of TV"
 "A Nightmare in the 'Burbs"
 "Leaving the Note"
 "The Bone"
 "Brownies"
 "A Horse in the Basement"
 "Planning the Raid"
 "The Assault"
 "On the Roofs"
 "Searching the House"
 "The Search Continues"
 "The Furnace"
 "Walter is Back"
 "Ray Peterson, Neighbor from Hell"
 "Aftermath"
 "Runaway Ambulance"
 "Canvas Fight"
 "Skulls" / "Catching Pinocchio"
 "Vacation's End"
 "End Titles"

The soundtrack album received a release on LP record in 2018 on the Waxwork Records label, as an expanded double-LP package. Additional music used in the film but not included on the soundtrack albums includes  "Machine" by Circus of Power;  "Se Sei Qualcuno è Colpa Mia" by Ennio Morricone; "Questa o Quella" by Enrico Caruso; and "Locked in a Cage", "Make Some Noise", and "Bloodstone" by Jetboy.

References

External links

 Official Site
 
 
 
 
 
 
 Windows Live Local – Mayfield Place from the air
 A discussion on the opening sequence
 The Klopek house (slide 14) in the New York Daily News' "Iconic Movie Homes" feature, June 2009

1980s black comedy films
1989 comedy films
1980s English-language films
1989 films
American black comedy films
Films directed by Joe Dante
Films scored by Jerry Goldsmith
Imagine Entertainment films
Universal Pictures films
1980s American films